The Division of Franklin is an Australian electoral division in Tasmania.

The division is the southernmost in Australia, located in southern Tasmania around the state capital, Hobart. It is non-contiguous, with the two parts of the division separated by the Division of Clark, based around central Hobart. As at the 2016 election, slightly more than half its electors are located on the eastern shore of the River Derwent, incorporating the entire City of Clarence and the suburb of Old Beach from Brighton Council. The remaining electors in the division are drawn from the southern parts of the Kingborough Council, generally south of the Huon Highway and including Bruny Island, and the entire Huon Valley Council.  The division also includes the southern parts of the Tasmanian Wilderness World Heritage Area and Macquarie Island, neither of which have permanent populations.

Geography
Since 1984, federal electoral division boundaries in Australia have been determined at redistributions by a redistribution committee appointed by the Australian Electoral Commission. Redistributions occur for the boundaries of divisions in a particular state, and they occur every seven years, or sooner if a state's representation entitlement changes or when divisions of a state are malapportioned.

History

The division was one of the five established when the former Division of Tasmania was redistributed on 2 October 1903 and is named for Sir John Franklin, the polar explorer who was Lt Governor of Van Diemen's Land 1843-46.

The Division of Franklin has always been a reasonably marginal seat, changing hands between the Australian Labor Party and the Liberal Party and its predecessors.  However, after 14 years of representation by former Labor and independent member Harry Quick, the seat of Franklin was considered safe Labor with Franklin one of very few electorates to record a swing to Labor at the 2010 election. Franklin also has a strong history of voting for strong candidates rather than for a particular party.

In 2005, sitting Labor member Harry Quick announced that he would retire at the 2007 election. When Labor preselected union official Kevin Harkins as a replacement, Quick, seeing him as unsuitable, appeared to endorse the Liberal candidate, Vanessa Goodwin, which was partly responsible for his expulsion from the Labor party. Harkins was eventually dropped as a candidate, and the Labor Party state secretary Julie Collins was installed as the ALP candidate.

Collins won the seat of Franklin at the 2007 election despite Labor suffering a 3.11% swing against on two party preferred results and 5.03% swing against in general results. Liberal candidate Vanessa Goodwin recorded a swing towards the party while the Australian Greens a swing towards the party similar to that of the Liberals.

Members

Election results

References

External links
 Division of Franklin - Australian Electoral Commission

Electoral divisions of Australia
Constituencies established in 1903
1903 establishments in Australia
Southern Tasmania
South West Tasmania